Police Women of Broward County is the first of TLC's Police Women reality documentary series, which follows four female members of the Broward County Sheriff's Office (BSO) in Broward County, Florida.

The series features four women, following them at their jobs as law enforcement officials and at home with their families. Throughout the show, the officers provide commentary on the particular incidents shown that they were involved in. Both seasons of the series features Julie Bower, Shelunda Cooper, and Andrea Penoyer. The first season featured Ana Murillo, who was replaced in season 2 with Erika Huerta.

Cast
 Julie Bower – A 13-year, well-respected veteran of the BSO, Bower is a 48-year-old detective who works exclusively on solving sex crimes and missing person cases. Bower's other previous assignments include the Dive Rescue Team, the Strategic Enforcement Team, road patrol, field-training deputy, and adviser for the BSO Explorer program.
 Shelunda Cooper – Rookie Shelunda is 25 and newly married to another BSO deputy, "J.C."  Her twin sister, Shanda, also works as a BSO deputy.
 Andrea Penoyer – Andrea is a 26-year-old deputy for the BSO, who is also back in school studying for a B.A. in public administration. During the first season Andrea was a single mother with her 8-year-old son, Dominic. Between seasons, she became engaged with a single father with two children.
 Erika Huerta – Replacing Deputy Murillo in the second season, native Floridian Erika Huerta is a deputy who currently lives in Miami; she has been a BSO deputy for the last three years.
 Ana Murillo – Present only in the first season, Ana is a 28-year-old deputy for the BSO, assigned to the Strategic Enforcement Team. She is married with a 3-year-old son, Anthony; however, she frequently cares for him herself, as her husband is often out of the country for work.

Note: Unless specified, all ages given reflect the first season of this series.

Episodes

Series overview

Season 1 (2009–2010)

Season 2 (2011–2012)

References

2000s American reality television series
2009 American television series debuts
2010s American reality television series
2011 American television series endings
English-language television shows
Television shows set in Florida
Police Women (TV series)
TLC (TV network) original programming
Broward County, Florida
Women in Florida